Maksym Ihorovych Feshchuk (born on 25 November 1985) is a Ukrainian amateur and former professional football forward who plays for Feniks Pidmonastyr.

Career
Feshchuk is a native of Brody, a city at north eastern edge of Lviv Oblast. He started out by playing at the Youth Football League (DYuFL) for the College of Physical Culture (UFK) in Lviv. After couple of years, Feshchuk joined the football heavy-weight of West Ukraine Karpaty Lviv.

He is participant of the 2005 FIFA World Youth Championship where playing three games he scored a goal against the national team of Panama in a group stage. Ukraine however was eliminated at the start of knock out rounds by Nigeria.

Honours
Ukraine under-21
 UEFA Under-21 Championship: runner-up 2006

External links
 Profile on the Karpaty Lviv Official Website 
 
 
 

1985 births
Living people
People from Brody
Ukrainian footballers
Ukraine youth international footballers
Ukraine under-21 international footballers
FC Karpaty Lviv players
FC Karpaty-2 Lviv players
FC Karpaty-3 Lviv players
SC Tavriya Simferopol players
FC Hoverla Uzhhorod players
FC Shakhter Karagandy players
FC Dacia Chișinău players
FC Taraz players
FC Arsenal Kyiv players
FC Vitebsk players
Ukrainian Premier League players
Ukrainian First League players
Ukrainian Second League players
Moldovan Super Liga players
Ukrainian expatriate footballers
Expatriate footballers in Kazakhstan
Expatriate footballers in Moldova
Ukrainian expatriate sportspeople in Kazakhstan
Ukrainian expatriate sportspeople in Moldova
Association football forwards
Expatriate footballers in Belarus
Ukrainian expatriate sportspeople in Belarus
Sportspeople from Lviv Oblast